Henry Nixon Flanaghan (10 February 1896 – 1938) was an English professional footballer who played as an outside left in the Football League for Grimsby Town and in the Scottish League for Third Lanark and Aberdeen.

References

1896 births
1938 deaths
Footballers from Nottingham
English footballers
Association football wingers
Third Lanark A.C. players
Aberdeen F.C. players
Maidstone United F.C. (1897) players
Grimsby Town F.C. players
Denaby United F.C. players
Scottish Football League players
English Football League players